A. K. Jayasankaran Nambiar is a judge of the Kerala High Court. The  High Court of Kerala  is the highest court in the Indian state of Kerala and in the Union Territory of Lakshadweep. The High Court of Kerala is headquartered at Ernakulam, Kochi.

Early life and education
Nambiar was born to Justice K. A. Nair, former judge of the Kerala High Court and Chandralekha Nayar. He completed his schooling from Lawrence School, Lovedale, graduated in chemistry from the Sacred Heart College, Thevara and obtained LL.B from Government Law College, Ernakulam with First Rank for which he was awarded the N. Govinda Menon Memorial Gold Medal. Nambiar has completed Masters of Arts in law from the University of Oxford in the United Kingdom.

Career
Nambiar enrolled as an advocate in 1990 and started practising in Ernakulam district with M/s. Menon & Pai Advocates. He specialised in constitutional law and taxationboth direct and indirect. In July2011, he was designated a senior advocate in the Kerala High Court and on 23January2014 he was elevated as an additional judge of High Court of Kerala and became permanent judge of High Court of Kerala on 10March2016.

References

Living people
Judges of the Kerala High Court
21st-century Indian judges
Year of birth missing (living people)